The World Group was the highest level of Fed Cup competition in 1996. Eight nations competed in a three-round knockout competition. Spain was the three-time defending champion, but they were defeated in the final by the finalist from the last two years, the United States, who captured their fifteenth title.

Participating Teams

Draw

First round

Spain vs. South Africa

Argentina vs. France

Germany vs. Japan

Austria vs. United States

Semifinals

Spain vs. France

Japan vs. United States

Final

Spain vs. United States

References

See also
Fed Cup structure

World Group